Smart Food is a global initiative led by the ICRISAT, a member of the CGIAR System Organization, and is jointly led with FARA, CORAF, FANRPAN and APAARI.

History
Smart Food Initiative was launched by ICRISAT in 2013. A major objective under the initiative is to promote the consumption of Millets, Sorghum and Legumes. Ms. Joanna Kane-Potaka, Assistant Director-General, External Relations, ICRISAT, is the executive director of Smart Food Initiative which is currently hosted at ICRISAT.

In January 2019, an Executive Council was established through the signing of Memorandums of Understanding. All Executive Council members have equal voting rights: Forum for Agricultural Research in Africa (FARA), Asia-Pacific Association of Agricultural Research Institutions (APAARI), Food Agriculture and Natural Resources Policy Analysis Network (FANRPAN), West and Central African Council for Agricultural Research and Development (CORAF), along with the International Crops Research Institute for the Semi-Arid Tropics (ICRISAT). In India, Smart Food is co-led by ICAR-IIMR.

First Lady of Niger, Lalla Malika Issoufou became the ambassador of Smart Food in March, 2019.

The Smart Food approach
This initiative leads a campaign to drive demand and to develop value chains for Smart Food crops. To benefit smallholder farmers and poor rural communities via research and outreach programs in countries like East and South Africa (Kenya, Tanzania, Malawi), West and Central Africa (Niger, Nigeria, Mali) and Asia Pacific (India, Taiwan, Myanmar).
Smart Food initiative envisions Smart Food crops becoming a part of regular diets and the food system by building millets and sorghum.

Smart Food reality TV shows
In 2017, The first Smart Food reality TV show was held in Kenya. 
The first Smart Food Culinary Challenge was launched with 58 student chefs from 16 culinary institutes across India. The show was held at the Organics and Millets International Trade Fair in Bengaluru in January, 2019.

Awards and recognition
Smart Food was selected by USAID and Australia as winning innovation for 2017 at Global Platform Launch Food

References

2013 establishments
Food and drink companies established in 2013